

Places 

Bearden may refer to:

 Bearden, Arkansas
 Bearden, Oklahoma
 Bearden, Knoxville, Tennessee

Other
Bearden (surname)